The following people are all converts to Buddhism, sorted alphabetically by family name.

From Abrahamic religions

From Christianity

From Islam

 Princess Mother Sri Sulalai (1770–1837), the consort of Phra Phutthaloetla Naphalai, Rama II of Siam and was the mother of Nangklao, Rama III.
 The Bunnag family, powerful noble family of Mon-Persian descent of the early Rattanakosin Kingdom of Siam, the descendants of Sheikh Ahmad who converted to Buddhism.
 Napapa Tantrakul (1986–), Thai actress who was raised as Muslim and converted to Buddhism in 2016
 Tillakaratne Dilshan (1976–), Sri Lankan cricket player who converted from Islam to Buddhism at the age of 16, previously known as Tuwan Muhammad Dilshan
 Tillakaratne Sampath (1982–), Sri Lankan cricket player who was previously known as Tuwan Mohammad Nishan Sampath
 Suraj Randiv (1985–), Sri Lankan cricket player who was previously known as Mohamed Marshuk Mohamed Suraj
 Pai Hsien-yung (1937–), son of KMT Muslim General Bai Chongxi, a Chinese American writer of Hui descent
 Wong Ah Kiu (1918–2006), Malay woman born to a Muslim family but raised as Buddhist; her conversion from Islam became a legal issue in Malaysia on her death

From Judaism
Nyanaponika Mahathera (1901–1994), German-born Theravada monk, co-founder and first president of the Buddhist Publication Society
Bhikkhu Bodhi (1944–), American Theravada Buddhist monk and scholar, founder of the Buddhist Global Relief
Ayya Khema (1923–1997), German Buddhist teacher and one of the organizers for the first International Conference on Buddhist Women
Larry Rosenberg (1932–), American Buddhist teacher who founded the Cambridge Insight Meditation Center
Peter Coyote (1941–), American actor and author
Surya Das (1950–), lama who founded Dzogchen Foundation and Centers
Tetsugen Bernard Glassman (1939–2018), American Zen Buddhist roshi and co-founder of the Zen Peacemakers
Zoketsu Norman Fischer (1946–), American poet, writer, and Soto Zen priest and founded the Everyday Zen Foundation
Zenkei Blanche Hartman (1926–2016), Soto Zen teacher practicing in the lineage of Shunryu Suzuki.
Kittisaro, disciple of Ajahn Chah and Ajahn Sumedho; meditation teacher in the Thai Forest Tradition
Hozan Alan Senauke (1947–), Soto Zen priest, folk musician and poet.
Jack Kornfield (1945–), teacher in the Vipassana Movement of American Theravada Buddhism
Sharon Salzberg (1952–), meditation teacher and co-founder of the Insight Meditation Society
Goldie Jeanne Hawn (1945–), American actress, producer, dancer, and singer.
Steven Seagal (1952–), American actor, producer, screenwriter, martial artist, and musician who holds American, Serbian, and Russian citizenship.
Robert Downey Jr. (1965–), American actor and producer
Yuttadhammo Bhikkhu (Noah Herschell Greenspoon) (1979–), Canadian Theravādin Buddhist monk

From Indian religions

From Hinduism

B. R. Ambedkar (1891–1956), Chief architect of the Constitution of India
Jagdish Kashyap (1908–1976), Buddhist monk
Bhadant Anand Kausalyayan, Buddhist monk, writer, and scholar
Balachandran Chullikkadu (1957–), Malayalam language poet from Kerala
Hansika Motwani,  indian actress.
Rahul Sankrityayan (1893–1963), Hindi author and translator
Iyothee Thass (1845–1914), Siddha practitioner and leader of the Dravidian movement
Laxman Mane (1949–), Dalit author and social worker
Swami Prasad Maurya, politician
Udit Raj (1958–), prominent Indian social activist and Buddhist polemicist
Lenin Raghuvanshi (1970–), activist, one of the founding members of People's Vigilance Committee on Human Rights (PVCHR)
Suresh Bhat (1932–2003), Indian poet and writer
Pracheen Chauhan, Indian television actor
Tisca Chopra (1973–), Indian actress, author and film producer
Vinay Jain, Indian television actor
Poonam Joshi (1980–), Indian television soap opera actress
Shibani Kashyap, Indian singer

From other or undetermined

Sister Uppalavannā (Else Buchholtz) (1886–1982), German Theravādin Buddhist nun, first European Buddhist nun in modern history 
 U Dhammaloka (Laurence Carroll) (1856–1914), Irish-born migrant worker turned Theravādin Buddhist monk and an active role in the Asian Buddhist revival around the turn of the twentieth century
Paul Dahlke (1865–1928), German physician and a pioneer of Buddhism in Germany, founder of “Das Buddhistische Haus” 
Sīlācāra (John Frederick S. McKechnie) (1871–1951), former Buddhist monk, lay Buddhist writer and translator
Ñāṇamoli Bhikkhu (Osbert John S. Moore) (1905–1960), British Theravādin Buddhist monk and translator of Pali literature
Ñāṇavīra Thera (Harold Edward Musson) (1920–1965), British Theravādin Buddhist monk, the author of Notes on Dhamma
Sāmanera Bodhesako (Robert Smith) (1939–1988), American Theravādin Buddhist monk who founded Path Press
Robert Baker Aitken (1917–2010), co-founded the Honolulu Diamond Sangha
 Reb Anderson (1943–), Zen teacher 
Alistair Appleton (1970–), British television presenter
Stephen Batchelor (1953–), writer
William Sturgis Bigelow (1850–1926), prominent American collector of Japanese art and converted to Tendai Buddhism
Orlando Bloom (1977–), actor who played Legolas in Lord of the Rings and The Hobbit
Kate Bosworth (1983–),  American actress
John Cage (1912–1992), American composer
Arabella Churchill (1949–2007), English charity founder, festival co-founder, and fundraiser
Chester Carlson (1906–1968), American physicist and inventor, best known for inventing electrophotography 
 Leonard Cohen (1934–2016), Canadian singer/songwriter/poet
John Crook (1930–2011), British ethologist
Ruth Denison (1922–2015), Vipassana Meditation teacher in United States, one of four Westerners to receive permission to teach from Sayagyi U Ba Khin  
 Chris Evans (1981–), American actor and best known for his role as Captain America in the Marvel Cinematic Universe (MCU) series of films.
Ernest Fenollosa (1853–1908), American professor of philosophy and political economy at Tokyo Imperial University
Richard Gere (1949–), actor and activist for Tibetan causes
 Allen Ginsberg (1926–1997), poet 
Yuttadhammo Bhikkhu (Noah Herschell Greenspoon) (1979–), Canadian Theravādin Buddhist monk 
 Natalie Goldberg (1948–), writer 
Herbie Hancock (1940–), jazz pianist who has also released funk and disco albums
Joseph Jarman (1937–), jazz musician and Jodo Shinshu priest
Miranda Kerr (1983–), model
 k.d. lang (1961–), Canadian singer
Jet Li (1963–), actor
 Courtney Love, American singer-songwriter
Menander I (died c. 130 BCE), Greco-Buddhist king (from pre-Christian Hellenistic religion)
Dennis Genpo Merzel (1944–), abbot of Kanzeon Zen Center
 Alanis Morissette, Canadian-American singer 
 Ole Nydahl (1941–), lama teacher 
Tenzin Palmo (1943–), nun of Drukpa Kagyu lineage
Li Gotami Govinda (Ratti Petit) (1906–1988), Indian painter, photographer, writer and composer (from Zoroastrianism) 
Zeena Schreck (formerly LeVey) (1963–), Berlin-based American visual and musical artist, author, the spiritual leader of the Sethian Liberation Movement (SLM), Tantric Tibetan Buddhist yogini and second daughter of the late Church of Satan's founder Anton LaVey.
 Oliver Stone (1946–), American film director 
 Sharon Stone (1958–), American actress, producer, and former fashion model
Tan-luan (6th to 7th century), Chinese Buddhist monk important to Pure Land Buddhism (from Taoism)
Thích Thanh Từ (1924–), Vietnamese Zen Buddhist monk (from Caodaism)
Robert Thurman (1941–), Buddhist priest and writer who has been called "the Billy Graham of Buddhism"
Tina Turner (1939–), American singer-songwriter, dancer, and actress who has won eight Grammy Awards
Philip Whalen (1923–2002), Beat generation poet and Zen monk
Sister Vajirā (Hannelore Wolf) (1928–1991), German Buddhist convert and former Ten-Precept nun
Adam Yauch (1964–2012), aka MCA, American rapper (member of Beastie Boys), songwriter, film director, and human rights activist

See also
 List of Buddhists
 Dalit Buddhist Movement
 List of converts to Buddhism from Christianity
 List of converts to Buddhism from Hinduism
 List of converts to Buddhism from Islam
 Jewish Buddhists
 Index of Buddhism-related articles

References

 
Converts To Buddhism
Buddhism